A metal is a material that is typically hard, opaque, shiny, and has good electrical and thermal conductivity.

Metal may also refer to:

People with the name
 Tamara Metal (born 1933), Israeli Olympic high jumper and long jumper, and captain of the Israel women's national basketball team

Art and entertainment

Music
 Metal music or heavy metal music

Albums
 Metal (Annihilator album)
 Metal (EP), an EP by Newsted
 Metal (Pierre Estève album)
 Metal (Manilla Road album) or its title track
 Metal (Preston Reed album) or its title track
 Metals (Feist album)

Songs
 "Metal" (song), a song by Gary Numan from The Pleasure Principle

Other uses in art and entertainment
Metal (magazine), an Argentine former heavy metal magazine
 Métal, a 1928 portfolio by Germaine Krull
 Metal: A Headbanger's Journey, a documentary
Metal Sonic, a character in Sonic the Hedgehog

Other uses 
 Metal (API), a graphics API from Apple for iOS and macOS
 Metal (Wu Xing), a phase of the Chinese philosophy of Wu Xing
 Metals, types of tincture in heraldry
Metal Township, Franklin County, Pennsylvania, US
 Slang for airplane

 Road metal, the crushed stone used for road surfaces and railway track ballast

See also
Medal
Meddle
 Metallicity: in astronomy, a "metal" is any element other than hydrogen or helium
Mettle (disambiguation)